Events in Libya in 2021.

Incumbents
 President: Fayez al-Sarraj
 Prime Minister: 
Abdullah al-Thani (until 5 February)
Abdul Hamid al-Dabaib (interim, starting 5 February)

Events
Ongoing – COVID-19 pandemic in Libya, Libyan Crisis, Second Libyan Civil War

January to April
January 5 – The Libyan dynar (national currency) drops from being worth .746 to .225 US dollars.
January 13 – Rival governments meet for talks aimed at unifying the national budget.
January 15 – The United Nations Security Council names Jan Kubis, a former Slovakian foreign minister, as its new envoy to Libya.
January 19 – Political rivals begin talks under United Nations auspicies to lay the groundwork for a legal foundation for elections on December 24.
January 28 – The United States calls for the immediate withdrawal of Russian and Turkish troops.
February 5
Abdul Hamid Dbeibah is chosen as transitional unity prime minister of Libya.
The International Organization for Migration says 800 European-bound migrants were intercepted by the Libyan Navy in the last 24 hours.
February 18 – Egyptian President Abdel Fattah el-Sisi and Prime Minister Abdul Hamid Mohammed Dbeibah meet in Cairo.
February 21 – Armed gunmen attack Interior Minister Fathi Bashagha’s motorcade in Tripoli.
February 22 – Authorities free 156 victims of human trafficking from Somalia, Eritrea, and Sudan in Kufra. Six traffickers are arrested.
February 28 – Fifteen people drown and 115, mostly migrants, are saved when a rubber boat sank near Zawiya. 41 people had drowned in a similar incident on February 20.
March 3
Agence France-Presse says a confidential UN report finds Prime Minister Abdul Hamid Dbeibah was elected after bribing at least three people. Dbeibah says the report is untrue.
The government says migration is not a top priority and calls upon international organizations to step up monitoring and rescue efforts.
March 7 – Parliamentarians from both sides arrive in Sirte to discuss the formation of a unity government.
March 10 – Parliament approves Abdulhamid Dbeibeh's interim cabinet 132–2.
March 31 – Two women and three migrant children drown when a boat capsizes. 77 others are rescued. 480 migrants were rescued over the weekend.
April 23 – The International Organization for Migration (IOM) reports that a shipwreck off the coast of Libya claims the lives of 130 migrants.
September 3 – Fighting breaks out between different factions in Tripoli as tensions rise throughout the country.

Predicted and scheduled events

March 29 – France is scheduled to reopen its embassy after seven years.
December 24 – elections
2021 Libyan presidential election
2021 Libyan parliamentary elections

Sports
March 26 – After seven years, international football returns to Libya. The Libyan national team lost 5–2 in an Africa Cup of Nations qualification match in ″Benina Martyrs Stadium″ (formerly ″Hugo Chavez Stadium″) near Benghazi.

Deaths
March 24 – Mahmoud al-Werfalli, suspected war criminal (Libyan National Army); shot

See also

COVID-19 pandemic in Africa
2021 in North Africa
 2020s in political history 
 Government of Libya
 Politics of Libya
Turkish military intervention in the Second Libyan Civil War
Slavery in Libya

References

External links
Abdul Hamid Dbeibah: Who is Libya’s new prime minister? (Al Jazeera, 6 Feb 2021)

 
2020s in Libya
Years of the 21st century in Libya
Libya
Libya